The Strokirk family, also known as the Strokirch family, is a Baltic German and Swedish noble family. Different branches of the family were elevated to noble rank in the Kingdom of Sweden and Livonian Knighthood.

Overview 
The family acquired both manors and estates in Sweden and Livonia (present-day Latvia and Estonia). In 1620, Evert Strokirch moved from Lübeck to Filipstad.
Members of the Strokirk family were in the 18th century living in the broader Karlskoga–Degerfors-area, where they managed ironworks, in the present-day corresponding municipalities of Degerfors and Karlskoga. Including the properties of the Lidetorp and Ölsboda Works.

Notable members 

 Einar von Strokirch
 Elias Strokirk
 Elias Carl Strokirk
 Jeppe Strokirk

See also 

 List of Swedish noble families

References

Further reading

External links 

 Von Strokirch family nr 1233 at adelsvapen.se
 Von Strokirch family nr 1059 at adelsvapen.se
 Strokirch nr 1082 at adelsvapen.se

 
Livonian noble families
Swedish noble families
Swedish families of German ancestry
Baltic nobility